Tamron 150-500mm F5-6.7 Di III VC VXD (A057) is a super-telephoto zoom lens designed and produced by Tamron for Sony E-mount full-frame cameras. It provides a equivalent focal length of 225-750mm when used on APS-C cameras. The lens was announced on April 22, 2021 and released on June 10.

Reference

Tamron lenses